Cacán (also Cacan, Kakán, Calchaquí, Chaka, Diaguita, and Kaka) is an extinct language that was spoken by the Diaguita and Calchaquí tribes in northern Argentina and Chile. It became extinct during the late 17th century or early 18th century. The language was documented by the Jesuit Alonso de Bárcena, but the manuscript is lost. Genetic affiliation of the language remains unclear, and due to the extremely limited number of known words, it has not been possible to conclusively link it to any existing language family.

Varieties

Loukotka (1968)
Varieties classified by Loukotka (1968) as part of the Diaguit language group:

Diaguit - extinct language once spoken by many tribes in the Argentine province of C?-tamarca. All the survivors are now Quechuanized. Dialects, all extinct:
Quilme - once spoken around the city of Quilmes, Catamarca by the Quilmes people.
Yocabil - once spoken in Catamarca in the Yocabil Valley.
Andalgalá - once spoken around the city of Andalgalá, Catamarca.
Abaucan or Tinogasta - once spoken in the Abaucán Valley, Catamarca.
Pasipa - once spoken in the Vicioso Valley, Catamarca.
Ancasti - once spoken in the Sierra de Ancasti, Catamarca.
Hualfin - once spoken in the Hualfin Valley, Catamarca.
Famatina - once spoken in the province of La Rioja in the Famatina Valley.
Caringasta - once spoken Calingasta in the Anguco Valley, San Juan province.
Sanogasta - once spoken in the province of La Rioja in the Sanogasta Valley.
Calian or Mocalingasta - once spoken in La Rioja province in the valley of Guadacol.
Sanagasta - once spoken in the Sierra de Velasco, La Rioja province.
Musitian - once spoken in La Rioja province in the Sierra de los Llanos.
Nolongasta - once spoken in the Chilecito Valley, La Rioja province.
Calehaqui or Cacan or Tocaque - extinct language once spoken in Salta province, in the Quimivil and Santa María Valleys. Dialects are:
Guachipa - once spoken in Salta Valley.
Tolombon or Pacioca - once spoken in the province of Tucumán in the Tolombon Valley.
Amaicha - once spoken in the Sierra de Aconquija, Tucumán province.
Tucumán or Tukma - once spoken around the city of Tucumán.
Soleo - once spoken in Tucumán province north of the Tucumán tribe.
Cupayana or Capayana - extinct language once spoken in San Juan and La Rioja provinces.
Amaná - once spoken around the city of Amaná, La Rioja province. (Unattested)
Chicoana or Pulare - once spoken in Salta Province in the Lerma Valley. (Unattested)
Indama or Ambargasta - once spoken north of Salinas Grandes, Santiago del Estero province. (Unattested)
Copiapó - once spoken around the city of Copiapó in the province of Atacama, Chile. (Unattested)

Mason (1950)
Mason (1950) lists the Diaguita subgroups of Abaucan, Amaycha, Anchapa, Andalgalá, Anguinahao, Calchaquí, Casminchango, Coipe, Colalao, Famatina, Hualfina, Paquilin, Quilme, Tafí, Tocpo, Tucumán, Upingascha, and Yocabil. Acalian, Catamarca, and Tamano are possibly also Diaguita subgroups according to Mason (1950).

List of known words 

Cacán vocabulary possibly exists today in toponyms and local surnames, but the etymologies are often dubious.

Other known words include:
 Ao, hao, ahao = town.
 Gasta = town.
 Kakanchik (transcribed into Spanish: "cacanchic") = Name of a deity apparently of fertility.
 Titakin (transcribed to the Castilian titaquin) = lord and king.
 Zupka = "altar", place of sacrifice.

Calchaqui words listed in Loukotka (1968):
 'head'
ma 'water'
tutu 'fire'
fil 'sun'
ki 'tree'
hua 'maize'

References 

Alain Fabre, 2005, Diccionario etnolingüístico y guía bibliográfica de los pueblos indígenas sudamericanos: CALCHAQUÍ

Diaguita
Indigenous languages of South America
Languages of Chile
Extinct languages of South America
Unclassified languages of South America
Languages extinct in the 18th century